Police Women of Dallas is the fourth installment of TLC's Police Women reality documentary series, which follows three police officers and a detective of the Dallas Police Department in Dallas, Texas. Despite not being renewed by TLC, the Oprah Winfrey Network ordered a second season which features three new cast members.

Cast
 Sergeant Tracy Jones
 Senior Corporal Melissa Person (season 1)
 Officer Sara Ramsey (season 1)
 Officer Mia Shagena (season 1)
 Officer Beth Burnside (season 1)
 Senior Corporal Cheryl Matthews (season 2)
 Detective Angela Nordyke (season 2)
 Officer Yvette Gonzales (season 2)

Episodes

Series overview

Season 1 (2010–11)

Season 2 (2013–14)

References

External links 
 
 
 

2010s American reality television series
2010 American television series debuts
English-language television shows
Television shows set in Dallas
Police Women (TV series)
Oprah Winfrey Network original programming
TLC (TV network) original programming
Women in Dallas